"Electronic Pleasure" is a song by English electronic dance music group N-Trance, featuring vocals from Gillian Wisdom and rap by Ricardo da Force. Released in February 1996 as the fourth and last single from their debut album by the same name (1995), it was the follow-up to their successful cover of "Stayin' Alive". The song peaked at number two in Israel, number nine in Scotland and number eleven on the UK Singles Chart. Additionally, it was a top 20 hit in Italy and a top 30 hit in France, peaking at number 17 and 23.

Critical reception
Maria Jimenez from Music & Media described the song as a "spacious electro pop dance number". British magazine Music Week gave it three out of five. An editor, Alan Jones, added, "It features the same guests, vocalist Gillian Wisdom and rapper Ricardo da Force, but is an edgy Euro-style dance track more like the earlier N-Trance hits." James Hyman from the RM Dance Update gave the song four out of five, writing, "N-Trance must be commended for musical versatility: after screaming rave and obvious yet effective disco pastiche they hit back with high-end Euro that echoes Snap's "Rhythm Is a Dancer"." Another editor, James Hamilton, declared it as an "Gillian Wisdom wailed Euro-style raver".

Chart performance
"Electronic Pleasure" was a notable hit on the charts in Europe, Australia and Israel, although it didn't reach the same level of success as its predecessor, "Stayin' Alive '95". The song entered the top 20 in the UK, peaking at number 11 in its first week on the UK Singles Chart on February 18, 1996, just barely missing the top 10. It spent one week at that position and within the top 20, before dropping to number 26 the following week. In Scotland however, the song entered the top 10, peaking at number nine. "Electronic Pleasure" was a top 20 hit also in Italy (17) and a top 30 hit in France (23), while reaching the top 60 in Sweden (58). On the Eurochart Hot 100, it peaked at number 69 in March 1996. Outside Europe, the single made its way to number two in Israel in February same year, and number 100 in Australia.

Music video
A music video was produced to promote the single, directed by Steve Price. It features the group performing in front of a large crowd at what appears to be a rave party in an abandoned building. Some scenes shows rapper Da Force outside, surrounded by fires and a burning car. Singer Wisdom appears at the party as a mysterious alien-like figure, wearing a white body suit and extended long white nails. The video was shot in a freezing cold morgue in the disused Prestwich Mental Hospital and also features a World War II army tank. It was later published on YouTube in June 2008, and had generated almost two million views as of January 2023.

Track listing

 12" maxi-single, Italy (1996)
A1. "Electronic Pleasure" (Electronic Pressure) – 5:06
A2. "Electronic Pleasure" (303 Mix) – 5:03
B. "Electronic Pleasure" (Dark Mix) – 7:05

 CD single, UK (1996)
"Electronic Pleasure" (Original Version) – 3:52
"Electronic Pleasure" (Tokyo Mix) – 6:41
"Electronic Pleasure" (Dark Mix) – 7:06
"Electronic Pleasure" (Sunshine State Mix) – 6:08                   
"Electronic Pleasure" (Electronic Pressure) – 5:08
"Electronic Pleasure" (Bagheads Remix) – 5:56
"Electronic Pleasure" (303 Mix) – 5:03

 CD single, the Netherlands (1996)
"Electronic Pleasure" (Original Version) – 3:49
"Electronic Pleasure" (Sunshine State Remix) – 6:07

 CD single (Electronic Pleasure 2), UK (1996)
"Electronic Pleasure" (Original Extended Version) – 5:48
"Set You Free" (Original 12" Version) – 7:16
"Stayin' Alive '95" – 4:06
"Electronic Pleasure" (Looney Choons Remix) – 7:30

 CD maxi-single, Europe (1996)
"Electronic Pleasure" (Original Radio Version) – 3:51
"Electronic Pleasure" (Original Mix) – 5:45
"Electronic Pleasure" (D-Generator Mix) – 6:45
"Electronic Pleasure" (Quicksilver Mix) – 8:07                   
"Electronic Pleasure" (Dark Mix) – 7:04
"Electronic Pleasure" (Tokyo Mix) – 6:40
"Electronic Pleasure" (Looney Choons Remix) – 7:29
"Electronic Pleasure" (Bag Heads Remix) – 5:56

Charts

References

 

1996 songs
1996 singles
N-Trance songs
Eurodance songs
All Around the World Productions singles